Nanda Kot ( Kumaoni-नन्दा कोट) is a mountain peak of the Himalaya range located in the Pithoragarh district of Uttarakhand state in India. The name Nanda Kot literally means "Nanda's Fortress" and refers to the abode of one of the sacred forms of the Hindu Goddess Parvati who in legend has made her sanctuary amongst the ring of lofty mountains in the region.

Description
Nanda Kot is connected to the Sanctuary wall by a high pass known as the Pindari Kanda, . This pass, Nanda Kot itself, and the ridge proceeding south from the peak together form the divide between the Pindar and Ghori Ganga River valleys, with Dana Dhura Pass connecting the two sides. The Kaphni (or Kafani), Pindar, Lawan, and Shalang Glaciers drain the south, west, north, and east sides of the peak respectively. 

The first attempt to climb Nanda Kot was made in 1905 by T.G. Longstaff, who proceeded by way of the Lawan Valley and Lawan Glacier. A new route involving a direct ascent of the south face was successfully undertaken by a British expedition led by Martin Moran in 1995. Mountaineering expeditions to Nanda Kot today typically follow the route through Loharkhet, Dhakuri Pass, Khati Village to Dwali base camp.

Outlying subpeaks of Nanda Kot include:
 Changuch, 
 Kuchela Dhura, 
 Nandabhaner (or Nandabhanar), 
 Dangthal, 
 Lespa Dhura (or Laspa Dhura), 
 Lamchir,

Nanda Devi/Nanda Kot nuclear controversy

In 1965, a covert mission was launched by an Indo-American team to install a nuclear-powered surveillance device on the top of Nanda Devi mountain to monitor Chinese activity in Tibet. The device was lost in a storm; in 1967, a similar device was place just below the summit of Nanda Kot.

See also
Survey of India

References

Mountains of Uttarakhand
Geography of Pithoragarh district
Six-thousanders of the Himalayas